St Mark's Anglican Community School is an independent Anglican co-educational primary and secondary day school, located on an  site on St. Mark's Drive, in the northern Perth, Western Australia suburb of Hillarys, Western Australia, on the former Red Cattle Ridge site.

The school was officially opened in 1986. The School employs over 200 staff, including teachers, education assistants, music tutors and administrative, grounds and maintenance staff.

Overview 
The primary and secondary schools are divided into four houses: Challen, Moyes, Watkins, and Carnley. Each House was named after a person who had been instrumental in the foundation of the School: Peter Carnley was Archbishop of Perth from 1981 to 2005, Michael Challen was an assistant bishop of Perth, Peter Moyes was headmaster of Christ Church Grammar School, and Glynn Watkins was an educator and administrator for over 40 years.

Principals 
There have been four principals at St Mark's: Barbara Godwin, Tony Stopher, Cameron Herbert and Steven Davies.

Notable alumni 

Felicity Palmateer - professional surfer
Jason Chatfield - cartoonist
Oscar Allen (footballer) - West Coast Eagles AFL footballer
Josh Rotham - West Coast Eagles AFL footballer
Calan Williams - racing driver
Hayley Miller - Fremantle Dockers AFL footballer

See also 

 Anglican education in Australia
 List of schools in the Perth metropolitan area

References 

1986 establishments in Australia
Educational institutions established in 1986
Anglican primary schools in Perth, Western Australia
Anglican secondary schools in Perth, Western Australia
Anglican Schools Commission
Junior School Heads Association of Australia Member Schools in Western Australia